Benjamin Henry Leman (born January 31, 1976) was a Republican member of the Texas House of Representatives for District 13.

Political positions
Leman considers himself a conservative Republican. He opposes abortion, gun control legislation, regulation on business, and illegal immigration.

Personal life
Leman was born in Magnolia, Texas. He's a 4th generation Texan. He graduated from the University of Texas at Austin with a BBA in finance. He married his wife Christie in 2004 and they have four children. Leman and his family have lived in Grimes County for 13 years. He and his family run a cow/calf operation, his children show animals at county fairs, they are active in the 4H-Club, and participate in youth sports. The Lemans are members of St. Stanislaus Catholic Church in Anderson.

Career
Leman is the co-founder of Merrimac Manufacturing, Inc. an oil and gas equipment manufacturing company. As CEO of the company grew to over 100 employees and 25 stocking locations around the world. Leman sold the company in 2012 to a publicly traded company.

Political career
Ben Leman (R) won in the general election against Cecil R. Webster (D) 79.1% to 20.9%. He is a former judge for Grimes County. He announced in September 2021 that he will not be running for re-election.

References

Living people
21st-century American politicians
Republican Party members of the Texas House of Representatives
Businesspeople from Texas
McCombs School of Business alumni
People from Grimes County, Texas
People from Magnolia, Texas
1961 births